Chremonides, son of Eteokles of Aithalidai, was an Athenian 3rd century BC statesman and general. He issued the Decree of Chremonides in 268 BC, creating an alliance between Sparta, Athens, and Ptolemy II, the Macedonian King of Egypt. This was a defensive alliance against King Antigonus of Macedon and led to the Chremonidean War. He is also recorded as having led an Egyptian fleet during the Battle of Ephesus in c. 258 BC.

External links
 Decree of Chremonides: number 19 in Bagnall and Derow, Greek Historical Documents

3rd-century BC Athenians